is the 6th major single by the Japanese girl idol group Shiritsu Ebisu Chugaku. It was released in Japan on June 4, 2014, on the label Defstar Records. The song was used as the opening theme for the 2014 anime series Nanana's Buried Treasure.

Release details 
The single was released in three versions: the Limited Anime Edition, the Limited Yodel Edition, and the Regular Edition. The Limited Anime Edition includes a DVD with the music video for the title track, while the other two editions are CD-only.

Track listing

Limited Anime Edition

Limited Yodel Edition

Regular Edition

Charts

References

External links 
 Discography - Shiritsu Ebisu Shugaku official site

2014 singles
2014 songs
Shiritsu Ebisu Chugaku songs
Anime songs
Japanese-language songs
Defstar Records singles